Giuseppe of Savoy (Giuseppe Benedetto Maria Placido; 5 October 1766 – 29 October 1802) was a prince of Savoy. He was styled the Count of Moriana from birth but was later created the Count of Asti.

Biography
Prince Giuseppe born at the Royal Palace of Turin, he was styled the Count of Moriana from birth. He was the youngest child of Victor Amadeus of Savoy (then styled as the "Duke of Savoy") and his wife, Maria Antonia Ferdinanda of Spain. To escape the threat of Napoleon I, Montferrat fled to Sardinia with his brothers the Duke of Aosta and Charles Felix of Sardinia where the trio lived in the Palazzo Carcassona.

In June 1799 his brother Charles Emmanuel IV created his brother Maurice, the Governor of the province of Sassari but he later died of malaria on the island in 1799. At the death of Montferrat, Asti became governor of Sassari in his brother's place. Catching malaria in 1802, Asti died of the disease having had a fit of convulsions and was buried at the  Cathedral of Alghero. His other brother Genoa later became the viceroy of Sardinia.

Ancestry

References

1766 births
1802 deaths
Princes of Savoy
Nobility from Turin
Deaths from malaria
Counts of Italy
Italian royalty
18th-century Italian people
19th-century Italian people
Burials at Alghero Cathedral
Sons of kings